In the United Kingdom, sporting events are broadcast on several national television networks, as well as radio. Many of the sporting events are listed online or in different kind of apps. These apps are mainly designed by sport fans who want to have an easy way to find when a certain game or match is played, as well as when a race starts or which channel is broadcasting the olympic games etc.

Certain sporting events are protected by the Ofcom Code on Sports and Other Listed and Designated Events and must be broadcast live and free-to-air on terrestrial television in the UK.

Presently, free-to-air means a TV channel which is free and covers 98% of the population. According to Ofcom regulations, qualifying free-to-air channels are BBC One, BBC Two, ITV, Channel 4 and Channel 5.

Association football

RADIO

BBC Radio 5 Live
Premier League: Live commentaries until 2024/25
Package 1: First pick Saturday 15:00 matches.
Package 4: Saturday 17:30 matches.
Package 5: Sunday 14:00 matches.
Package 6: Sunday 16:30 matches.
ALSO All matches from two midweek match rounds live on 5 Live/5 Sports Extra and BBC Sport website and app.
Live commentary of all England international matches.
Live commentary on selected Scotland, Wales and Northern Ireland international matches
Live commentary on selected UEFA Champions League involving British clubs
Live commentary on WSL matches
Live commentary on all FIFA World Cup Finals matches until 2024 and all UEFA European Championship Finals matches until 2028
Live commentary on the FA Community Shield

talkSPORT
Premier League: Live commentaries until 2024-25
Package 2: Second pick 15:00 matches on talkSPORT2.
Package 3: 12:30 Saturday matches.
Package 7: 20:00 Friday matches and 20:00 Monday matches.
ALSO Live commentaries on all rearranged midweek matches.
All Boxing Day matches and one further midweek match round live via talkSPORT/talkSPORT2 and talkSPORT app.

Live FA Cup matches.
Live EFL matches.
Live EFL Cup and EFL Trophy matches.
Live England international matches with selected Scotland, Wales and Northern Ireland international matches.
Live commentary of FIFA World Cup Finals and UEFA European Championships.
Live UEFA Champions League and the UEFA Europa League matches.
Live WSL matches.

BBC World Service

Over 50 live Premier League commentaries per season via BBC Radio 5 Live from 15:00 Saturday and 16:30 Sunday matches.
11 live FA Cup matches via BBC Radio 5 Live including Final.

BBC Radio Scotland

Commentary on Scottish Premiership matches with split coverage on MW/DAB and FM frequencies
Commentary on Scottish Cup and Scottish League Cup matches
Commentary on Scotland international matches

BBC Radio Wales

Commentary on Cardiff City (103.9 FM), Swansea City (93.9 FM), Newport County (95.9 FM) and Wrexham (95.4/91.1 FM) matches 
Commentary on Wales international matches until 2026

BBC Radio Ulster

Reports and commentary on Irish League football with some split coverage on BBC Radio Foyle Digital
Commentary on Northern Ireland international matches

BBC Radio Foyle 

Commentary on Derry City matches in the League of Ireland

BBC Local Radio

Local Premiership, EFL and FA Cup commentaries via BBC Local Radio with some split frequency coverage

Clyde 1
Preview, half-time and full-time reports from Scottish Premiership matches during weekend Superscoreboard programming

Independent Radio News (for UK commercial radio network)
Reports and goalflashes from every Premier League match including live updates in networked IRN hourly news bulletins 
Reports and goalflashes from selected FA Cup matches including semi-finals and final
Reports and goalflashes from EFL Cup Final and Championship play-off final
Reports and goalflashes from England home matches

Rugby league

Television

20 live streamed matches from Challenge Cup, League 1, Women's Super League and Wheelchair Rugby League via The Sportsman

Radio
 BBC Radio 5 Live Sport Extra
Live Super League and Challenge Cup matches with reports on BBC Radio 5 Live
Live State of Origin via ABC Radio on BBC Radio 5 Sports Extra

 BBC Local Radio
Commentaries on Super League, Championship and Challenge Cup matches

 talkSPORT 2
Up to 80 Super League matches live per season

Rugby union

Television

Radio
BBC Radio 5 Live and BBC Radio 5 Live Sports Extra
 Live commentary of Six Nations Championship matches until 2025
 Live commentary on Premiership Rugby
 Live commentary on European Rugby Champions Cup
 Live commentary of 2023 Rugby World Cup

talkSPORT and talkSPORT2
 Commentary on all Autumn International Series matches until 2024
 Live commentary on Premiership Rugby
 Reports from Six Nations Championship matches

BBC Radio Wales and BBC Radio Cymru
 All Wales Six Nations matches live; Autumn internationals live on BBC Radio Cymru

BBC Radio Ulster
 Live commentary on all Ulster European Rugby Champions Cup matches and selected Ulster URC matches
 Commentary on all Ireland Six Nations matches
 Commentary on Ireland Autumn International matches

BBC Radio Scotland
 Commentary on all Scotland Six Nations matches

Independent Radio News (for UK commercial radio network)
 Reports from Six Nations Championship matches

Cricket

Television 

 In-play video highlights clips of ICC events on BBC Sport and Sky Sports websites
 In-play video highlights clips of ECB home international and domestic events on BBC Sport website until 2024
 Clips also available for free on Sky Sports and England and Wales Cricket Board websites
 Live free streaming coverage of selected County matches via county cricket club websites and YouTube channels

Radio
BBC Radio 5 Live and BBC Radio 5 Sports Extra:
 Live Test Match Special commentary on all England home Test, ODI & T20 matches until 2024 (also on BBC Radio 4 Long Wave)
 Live commentary on all The Hundred matches on BBC Radio 5 Live, Radio 5 Sports Extra and BBC Sport website until 2024
 ICC Cricket World Cup, ICC Champions Trophy & ICC World Twenty20 live matches
 Sports Extra commentary on Cricket Australia international matches via ABC Radio Grandstand, plus selected Big Bash League and Women's Big Bash League matches until 2022
 Sports Extra commentary on Indian Premier League matches until 2022
 Live commentary on selected England away series (Test, ODI & T20)

BBC Local Radio (including BBC Radio Wales):
 Commentary on all First Class county, List A and T20 Blast matches on BBC Sport website until 2024
 Selected matches on BBC Radio 5 Sports Extra

talkSPORT and Times Radio
 Live reports from England home international cricket matches

talkSPORT 2
 Live commentary on Ireland and Netherlands home matches in 2022
 Live commentary on New Zealand v England Test, ODI and T20 matches until 2025

Tennis

Television

Radio
 BBC Radio 5 Live and Radio 5 Sports Extra: Commentary on all four Grand Slam tournaments plus selected other tournaments including the BNP Paribas Open at Indian Wells and the Queens Club Championships
 BBC World Service: Commentary on Wimbledon men's and women's singles finals
 talkSPORT: Live reports from Wimbledon
 Independent Radio News (for UK commercial radio network): Hourly reports from Wimbledon including live updates in networked IRN hourly news bulletins
 LBC News: Twice-hourly live reports from Wimbledon

Golf

Radio
 BBC Radio 5 Live: Commentary on The Open Championship, US Open, US Masters, PGA Championships and Ryder Cup.
 talkSPORT2: Commentary on The Open Championship, Live commentary on US PGA Tour events from PGA Tour Radio.

Motorsport

Television

Boxing 
 Premier Boxing Champions: FITE TV (PPV)
 Matchroom Boxing: DAZN - 16 nights of boxing per year until 2025
 Golden Boy: DAZN
 Frank Warren: BT Sport and BT Sport Box Office
 Top Rank: Sky Sports until 2025
 Boxxer: Sky Sports until 2025
 Dream Boxing: DAZN: October 2022 to October 2025, all fights
 Wasserman Boxing: Channel 5 - 5 nights of boxing in 2022

Radio
 BBC Radio 5 Live and talkSPORT
Commentary on major fights involving British boxers

Mixed martial arts 

 Bellator: Live on BBC iPlayer and selected events on BBC Three
 Bushido MMA: DAZN: October 2022 to October 2025, all fights
 International Mixed Martial Arts Federation: Viaplay Sports
 Ultimate Fighting Championship: Live on BT Sport and BT Sport Box Office until 2021
 Ultimate Challenge MMA: Fight Network
 ONE Championship: Live events on YouTube and BoxNation, delayed on Viaplay Xtra

Kickboxing 
 King of Kings: DAZN: October 2022 to October 2025, all fights

Professional Wrestling

Television 
 World Wrestling Entertainment: Live on BT Sport and BT Sport Box Office
 RAW and Smackdown highlights on 5ACTION
 All Elite Wrestling: ITV, ITV4

Multi-disciplines events

Television

Radio
 Olympic Games: Live on BBC Radio 5 Live (until 2032)
 Paralympic Games: Live on BBC Radio 5 Live
 European Championships (multi-sport event): Live on BBC Radio 5 Live

Athletics

Television
 British Athletics major events: Live on BBC in 2023
 London Marathon: Live on BBC until 2026; Live on Eurosport
 Great North Run: Live on BBC
 Great Manchester Run: Live on BBC
 Great Scottish Run: Live on BBC
 Big London Half: Live on BBC Red Button until 2026
 Cardiff Half Marathon: Highlights on S4C in 2022
 Vitality London 10000: Live on BBC Red Button until 2026
 Vitality Westminster Mile: Live on BBC Red Button until 2026
 World Athletics Championships: Live on BBC until 2025; live on Eurosport in 2023
 Diamond League: Live on BBC until 2024
 World Athletics Continental Tour Gold: Live on Viaplay Sports from 2023 to 2029
 World Athletics Indoor Championships: Live on BBC until 2027
 World Athletics Indoor Tour Gold: Live on Viaplay Sports in 2023
 World Athletics Cross Country Championships: Live on BBC until 2023
 World Athletics Half Marathon Championships: Live on BBC Red Button in 2020
 World Athletics Relays: Live on BBC until 2023
 European Athletics Championships: Live on BBC and Eurosport
 European Team Championships: Live on BBC
 European Athletics Indoor Championships: Live on BBC
 European Cross Country Championships: Live on BBC
 World Junior Athletics Championships: Live on Eurosport
 New York Marathon: Live on Eurosport
 Paris Marathon: Live on Eurosport
 NCAA Indoor Track and Field Championships: BT Sport
 NCAA Outdoor Track and Field Championships: BT Sport

World Athletics Indoor Tour Silver and Bronze meetings in Europe live via European Athletics YouTube channel

Radio
 BBC Radio 5 Live
Commentary from World Championships, European Athletics Championships, IPC Athletics World Championships, Diamond League and UK Athletics major events

Snooker

Television

Horse racing

Television

 Sky Sports Racing
 Live coverage from 25 UK courses including Ascot, Chepstow, Chester, Doncaster and Lingfield.
 Over 200 fixtures from France (including Prix de l'Arc de Triomphe), Hong Kong, United States (including Breeders' Cup and Triple Crown), Australia (including Melbourne Cup) and South Africa.
 Racing TV
 Live coverage from 35 UK courses including Aintree, Cheltenham, Epsom, Goodwood, Haydock, Kempton, Newbury, Newmarket, Sandown and York.
 Irish racing.

Radio
 BBC Radio 5 Live
Commentary on all major races with full coverage of The Cheltenham Festival, The Grand National, Royal Ascot and The Epsom Derby
 BBC World Service
BBC Radio 5 Live commentary on The Grand National
 Talksport
Commentary on all major races at The Cheltenham Festival, The Grand National, Royal Ascot and The Epsom Derby, plus daily racing commentaries on Talksport 2.

Equestrianism

Television

Darts

Television

Radio
 Premier League Darts, World Darts Championship, World Matchplay and other major PDC tournaments: Live on talkSPORT 2

Rowing

Television

Cycling

Television

Swimming

Television

Radio
 World Championships: Live commentary on BBC Radio 5 Sports Extra

Triathlon

Television
 ITU World Series: Live on BBC
 Super League Triathlon: Live on BBC and Eurosport

Gymnastics

Television
 European Gymnastics Championship: Live on BBC and Eurosport
 World Gymnastics Championship: Live on BBC
 Gymnastics World Cup (UK): Live on BBC

Gridiron Football (American Football)

Television
 National Football League 
Sky Sports: Five regular season games each week plus play-offs and Superbowl live until 2024/25
ITV Sport: Two London Games and Superbowl live plus weekly highlights until 2024/25**
Channel 5: Monday Night Football live plus weekly highlights show until 2022/23
Amazon Prime Video: Live Thursday and Saturday games until 2022/23
 NCAA College Football: Live on BT Sport

Radio
 Live commentary on one Sunday night match per week and Superbowl on BBC Radio 5 Sports Extra.
 Live commentary from over 40 matches per season and Superbowl on talkSPORT 2

Ice hockey

Television
 National Hockey League: Live on Viaplay Sports until 2027 
 Elite League Ice Hockey: Live on  Viaplay Sports until 2024
 Champions Hockey League: Live on Viaplay Sports until 2023; live on Viaplay Sports from 2023 to 2028
 IIHF World Championships: Live on Viaplay Sports from 2024 to 2028
 Kontinental Hockey League: Live on Viaplay Xtra
 Spengler Cup: Semi-finals and Final live on Viaplay Xtra until 2021

Field hockey

Television
 Men's and Women's Pro Leagues: Live on BT Sport
 Men's and Women's EuroHockey Championships: Live on BBC and EuroHockey TV
 Euro Hockey League: Live on BT Sport and EuroHockey TV
 Men's England Hockey League: Semi-finals and finals live on YouTube.
 Women's England Hockey League: Semi-finals and finals live on YouTube.

Basketball

Television
 British Basketball League: 30 live matches per season on Sky Sports, including BBL Trophy Final, BBL Cup Final and BBL Playoffs until 2023
 Women's British Basketball League: WBBL Trophy, WBBL Cup and WBBL Play-Off Finals live on Sky Sports until 2023
 National Basketball Association: Live on Sky Sports with nine games live on BBC in 2022/23
 NCAA College Basketball: Live on BT Sport
 EuroLeague: Viaplay Xtra 1 game a week, all playoff games and final four games
 EuroCup Basketball: London Lions games live on BT Sport

Baseball

Television
 Major League Baseball: Live on BT Sport; MLB London Series live on BBC until 2026
 College Baseball: College World Series games live on BT Sport

Softball

Television
 College Softball: Regular season games live on ESPN Player. Select Women's College World Series games also live on BT Sport
 Women's Softball World Championship: Live on WBSC's YouTube channel
 Men's Softball World Championship: Live on WBSC's YouTube channel
 Junior Men's Softball World Championship: Live on WBSC's YouTube channel

Winter sports

Television
 Winter Olympics: Live on Eurosport and BBC until 2030
 Winter Paralympics: Live on Channel 4 until 2022
 Alpine Skiing World Cup: Live on Eurosport until 2025-26; highlights on Viaplay Xtra and highlights of selected European races on BBC Sport
 Cross-Country Skiing World Cup: Live on Eurosport until 2025-26
 Freestyle Skiing World Cup: Live on Eurosport until 2025-26
 Nordic Combined World Cup: Live on Eurosport until 2025-26
 Ski Jumping World Cup: Live on Eurosport until 2025-26
 Snowboard World Cup: Live on Eurosport until 2025-26
 Alpine Skiing World Championships: Live on BBC Red Button; Live on Eurosport until 2025
 Nordic Skiing World Championships: Live on Eurosport until 2025
 World Figure Skating Championships: Live on BBC Sport until 2023; live on Viaplay Sports from 2024 to 2028
 European Figure Skating Championships: Live on Eurosport

Sailing

Television
 America's Cup: Live on Sky Sports; highlights on BBC Sport
 Sailing World Championships: Live on BBC Sport

Gaelic games

Television
 GAA: All Ireland football and hurling semi-finals and final live on BBC Northern Ireland, with one All-Ireland Final live on BBC TWO network television until 2027
 Ulster Senior Football Championship: Eight live games on BBC Northern Ireland including Ulster Football Final until 2027
 Allianz National Football League: 10 live games via BBC iPlayer until 2027

Radio
 BBC Radio Ulster
Live coverage of all games in the Ulster Senior Football Championships

Shinty

Television
 Live coverage of Premier Division matches plus Camanachd Cup Final, Macaulay Cup Final and Scotland v Ireland shinty–hurling international on BBC

Netball

Television
 Netball Superleague: Live on Sky Sports
 ANZ Premiership: Live on Sky Sports
 International Netball Super Series: Live on Sky Sports

Badminton

Television
 BWF World Tour: Live on BT Sport
 BWF World Championships: Live on BT Sport
 All England Badminton Championships: Live on BBC Red Button and BT Sport in 2023

Squash

Television
 World Squash Championships: Live on BT Sport
 PSA World Series: Live on BT Sport and Eurosport Player

Bowls

Television
 World Indoor Bowls Championships: Live on BBC Sport

Table tennis

Television
 World Table Tennis Championships: Live on Eurosport until 2020
 Table Tennis World Cup: Live on Eurosport until 2020
 ITTF World Tour (including Grand Finals): Live on Eurosport until 2020
 European Table Tennis Championships: Live on Eurosport until 2020
 Europe Top 16 Cup: Live on Eurosport until 2020

Australian rules football

Television
 Australian Football League: Live on BT Sport

Futsal

Television
 FA National Futsal League: Live on BT Sport
 FIFA Futsal World Cup: TBA (2024)
 UEFA Futsal Champions League: Live on BT Sport (Final four only)

Archery

Television
 World Archery Championships: Live on World Archery's YouTube channel
 Archery World Cup: Live on World Archery's YouTube channel

Handball

Television
 IHF World Men's Handball Championship: Live on Viaplay Sports
 IHF World Women's Handball Championship: Live on Viaplay Sports

Volleyball

Television
 CEV Challenge Cup: Live on EuroVolley TV
 CEV Women's Challenge Cup: Live on EuroVolley TV
 College Volleyball: Live on ESPN Player. National Championship games live on BT Sport

References

Sports television in the United Kingdom
United Kingdom